Canarium kipella is a species of plant in the Burseraceae family. It is endemic to Java in Indonesia. It is an endangered species threatened by habitat loss.

References

kipella
Endemic flora of Java
Endangered plants
Taxonomy articles created by Polbot
Taxa named by Friedrich Anton Wilhelm Miquel